Jorge Toriello Garrido (23 April 1908 – 16 June 1998) was one of the three leaders of the first government that ruled Guatemala from 20 October 1944 to 15 March 1945 as part of the October Revolution. Toriello Garrido, a civilian, led the government along with Captain Jacobo Arbenz Guzmán and Major Francisco Javier Arana after overthrowing the military regime of Juan Federico Ponce Vaides, who had temporarily taken over from ousted dictator Jorge Ubico. He was the Minister of Finance in 1945.

References 

1908 births
1998 deaths
Presidents of Guatemala
Finance ministers of Guatemala
People from Guatemala City